Jérôme Gauthier-Leduc (born July 30, 1992) is a Canadian professional ice hockey defenceman who is currently playing for HC Ajoie of the National League (NL).

Playing career
Gauthier-Leduc was selected by the Buffalo Sabres in the third round (68th overall) of the 2010 NHL Entry Draft.

In the 2015–16 season, after 57 games with the Sabres AHL affiliate, the Rochester Americans he was traded to the Ottawa Senators as part of a seven-player deal on February 27, 2016. He was directly assigned to AHL affiliate, the Binghamton Senators for the remainder of the year.

As a free agent in the off-season, Leduc was unable to attract an NHL contract, and on August 27, 2016, he opted to sign a one-year contract abroad with Czech club, HC Dynamo Pardubice of the ELH. In February 2017, Leduc agreed a move to the Belfast Giants of the UK's Elite Ice Hockey League, penning a deal until the end of the season.

Leduc left Belfast in June 2017 to sign for Austrian club, Dornbirn Bulldogs of the EBEL. He played two seasons with the Bulldogs before continuing his European career in Sweden, agreeing as a free agent to a one-year Allsvenskan contract with Västerås IK on July 17, 2019.

In 2020, Leduc returned to Austria to sign for the Vienna Capitals.

On June 11, 2021, Leduc joined newly promoted HC Ajoie of the National League (NL) on a two-year deal.

Career statistics

Regular season and playoffs

International

Awards and honours

References

External links 

1992 births
Living people
Canadian people of French descent
Belfast Giants players
Binghamton Senators players
Buffalo Sabres draft picks
Canadian ice hockey defencemen
Dornbirn Bulldogs players
HC Dynamo Pardubice players
Gwinnett Gladiators players
French Quebecers
Rimouski Océanic players
Rochester Americans players
Rouyn-Noranda Huskies players
Vienna Capitals players
Ice hockey people from Quebec City
Canadian expatriate ice hockey players in the United States
Canadian expatriate ice hockey players in Northern Ireland
Canadian expatriate ice hockey players in the Czech Republic
Canadian expatriate ice hockey players in Austria
Canadian expatriate ice hockey players in Sweden
Canadian expatriate ice hockey players in Switzerland